Route 87 Business or Highway 87 Business may refer to:
 U.S. Route 87 Business
 Georgia State Route 87 Business
 North Carolina Highway 87 Business

See also
List of highways numbered 87
List of highways numbered 87 Bypass